Crescenzio is the Italian form of the name Crescentius.  It can refer to:

Pier Crescenzio or Pietro de' Crescenzi, mediaeval Italian jurist and writer on agriculture
Crescenzio Sepe, Italian cardinal 
Either of two 12th century bishops of Sabina.
Francesco Crescenzio, painter
Crescenzio Gambarelli, painter